Bay Creek is a stream in southwest Ripley and southeast Oregon counties in southern Missouri and northern Randolf County in northern Arkansas. It is a tributary of the Eleven Point River.

Bay Creek has the name of the local Bay family.

See also
List of rivers of Arkansas
List of rivers of Missouri

References

Rivers of Randolph County, Arkansas
Rivers of Oregon County, Missouri
Rivers of Ripley County, Missouri
Rivers of Arkansas
Rivers of Missouri